Wang Peng (born February 1964) is a lieutenant general in the People's Liberation Army of China, currently serving as head of the Training and Administration Department of the Central Military Commission.  

He is a representative of the 20th National Congress of the Chinese Communist Party and a member of the 20th Central Committee of the Chinese Communist Party.

Biography
Wang was born in Xiangxiang County (now Xiangxiang), Hunan, in February 1964. 

After graduating from the Department of Economics, Nanjing University in 1985, he was assigned to researcher of the Strategic Theory Department of the PLA Academy of Military Sciences. He repeatedly asked for reassignment and came to Army Command College of the Chinese People's Liberation Army to receive a two-year professional training for synthetic staff officers. He joined the Chinese Communist Party (CCP) in November 1986. He participated in the Battle of Lao Mountain during the Sino-Vietnamese War. In March 2001, he graduated from the PLA National Defence University. In July 2006, he was appointed commander of the 34 Motor-Driven Infantry Brigade of the 12 Group Army (now 71st Group Army), and eventually becoming deputy chief of staff of the group army. In 2016, he was promoted to become deputy chief of staff of the Eastern Theater Command Ground Force, a position he held until June 2019, when he was made president of the Army Command College of the Chinese People's Liberation Army. He was vice president of the PLA National Defence University in June 2021, in addition to serving as chief education officer. In December 2021, he was chosen as head of the Training and Administration Department of the Central Military Commission, succeeding Li Huohui.

He was promoted to the rank of major general (shaojiang) in July 2017 and lieutenant general (zhongjiang) in December 2021.

Wang was a full member of the 20th Central Committee of the Communist Party of China.

References

1964 births
Living people
People from Xiangxiang
Nanjing University alumni
PLA National Defence University alumni
People's Liberation Army generals from Hunan
People's Republic of China politicians from Hunan
Chinese Communist Party politicians from Hunan
Members of the 20th Central Committee of the Chinese Communist Party